Randall Cole is a Canadian film director and screenwriter. He is most noted for his 2008 film Real Time, for which he was a Genie Award nominee for Best Original Screenplay at the 29th Genie Awards in 2009.

A graduate of the Canadian Film Centre, he also wrote and directed the feature films 19 Months (2002) and 388 Arletta Avenue (2011), and was a writer for the horror television series Darknet.

References

External links

21st-century Canadian screenwriters
21st-century Canadian male writers
Canadian male screenwriters
Canadian television writers
Canadian film directors
Canadian Film Centre alumni
Living people
Year of birth missing (living people)